Anthony Richard Hurd, Baron Hurd (2 May 1901 – 12 February 1966) was a British politician and former Conservative Member of Parliament for Newbury.

Parliamentary career
Hurd was first elected to the Newbury constituency in the 1945 general election and won each successive election in Newbury until standing down before the 1964 general election. He was knighted for his political service in 1959.

Life peerage
On 24 August 1964 he was created a Life Peer as Baron Hurd, of Newbury in the Royal County of Berkshire which entitled him to a seat in the House of Lords. He died just two years later at the age of 64.

Family
His father, Sir Percy Hurd, was MP for Devizes, his brother was Robert Hurd (architect); his son, Douglas now Lord Hurd of Westwell, was MP for Mid-Oxfordshire and former Foreign Secretary. His grandson, Nick Hurd was MP for Ruislip Northwood and Pinner from 2005 to 2019.

Personal life
Hurd married on 26 September 1928 Stephanie Frances Corner daughter of Edred Moss Corner 
who was invested as a Fellow, Royal College of Surgeons (F.R.C.S.) and they had three children.

Douglas Richard Hurd, Baron Hurd of Westwell CH CBE PC  (1930-)   
British Conservative politician who served in the governments of Margaret Thatcher and John Major from 1979 to 1995.
John Julian Hurd (1932-1951)
Honourable Stephen Anthony Hurd (1933-2019)

References

External links
Lord Hurd at www.thePeerage.com

1901 births
1966 deaths
People educated at Marlborough College
Alumni of Pembroke College, Cambridge
Conservative Party (UK) MPs for English constituencies
Newbury, Berkshire
Conservative Party (UK) life peers
UK MPs 1945–1950
UK MPs 1950–1951
UK MPs 1951–1955
UK MPs 1955–1959
UK MPs 1959–1964
UK MPs who were granted peerages
Anthony
Knights Bachelor
Life peers created by Elizabeth II